Società Sportiva Calcio Napoli, commonly referred to as Napoli, is an Italian professional football club based in the city of Naples, Campania that plays in Serie A, the top flight of Italian football. Napoli has won two Serie A titles, six Coppa Italia titles, two Supercoppa Italiana titles, and one UEFA Cup.

The club was formed in 1926 as Associazione Calcio Napoli following the merger of U.S. Internazionale Napoli and Naples Foot-Ball Club. Napoli saw relatively little success in its early years, winning their first major trophy in the 1962 Coppa Italia. Napoli then saw increased success in the late 1970s (including their second Coppa Italia in 1976) and especially in the 1980s, after the club acquired Diego Maradona in 1984. During his time in Naples, Maradona helped the team win several trophies, which led to the club retiring his number 10 jersey. During this period, Napoli won both of their league titles, in 1987 and 1990, the 1987 Coppa Italia, the 1990 Supercoppa Italiana, and their only European trophy with the 1989 UEFA Cup. Following his departure, however, Napoli struggled financially, and endured several relegations and a bankruptcy, prior to being re-founded in 2004 by film producer Aurelio De Laurentiis. Under his leadership, the club has stabilized, which has led to renewed on-field success, winning 2005-06 Serie C1, the 2012, 2014, and 2020 Coppa Italia titles, and the 2014 Supercoppa Italiana.

By attendance, Napoli have the fourth-largest fan base in Italy, and were ranked as the fifth highest-earning football club in Serie A, with $182 million in revenue during the 2017–18 season. In 2018, Forbes estimated the club is the fifth most valuable club in Italy, worth $379 million. Napoli are also one of the associate members of the European Club Association.

Since 1959, the club has played their home games at the Stadio San Paolo, which was renamed Stadio Diego Armando Maradona after the Argentine's death in 2020. Napoli traditionally wear sky blue shirts, white shorts, and sky blue socks at home and white shirts, white or sky blue shorts, and white or sky blue socks away; this is derived from the shirts of Naples FBC and the shorts of Internazionale Napoli after the clubs merged to form Napoli in 1922. Napoli have rivalries with Roma, Juventus and Palermo. The club's anthem is "'O surdato 'nnammurato", one of the most famous songs in the Neapolitan language.<ref>Joseph Sciorra, Italian Folk: Vernacular Culture in Italian-American Lives (2010), page 116 "the Neapolitan standard O surdato 'nnammurato (A Soldier in Love)"</ref>

History

Origins
Napoli traces its roots to the first relevant Neapolitan club, founded as Naples Foot-Ball & Cricket Club in 1905 by English sailor William Poths and his associate Hector M. Bayon. Neapolitans such as Conforti, Catterina and Amedeo Salsi were also involved; Salsi was named the club's first president. The original kit of the club was a sky blue and navy blue striped shirt, with black shorts. Naples' first match was a 3–2 win against the English crew of the boat Arabik with goals from William MacPherson, Michele Scafoglio and Léon Chaudoir.

Early into its existence, the Italian Football Championship was limited to just northern clubs, so southern clubs competed against sailors or in cups such as Thomas Lipton's Lipton Challenge Cup. In the cup competed between Naples FBC and Palermo FBC Naples won three finals. The foreign contingent at the club broke off in 1911 to form Internazionale Napoli, who wore blue shirts with white shorts, in time for both club's debut in the Italian Championship of 1912–13. Each of the teams won a Prima Categoria southern Italian title and therefore competed in the national semifinal, Naples doing so in 1912–13 and Internazionale Napoli in 1913–14. They were set to face each other for the southern title again in 1914–15 but it was canceled due to World War I.

Due to financial pressure, the two rival clubs merged as the Foot-Ball Club Internazionale-Naples, abbreviated as FBC Internaples on 2 October 1922. Internaples', and later Napoli's kits are derived from those of Naples FBC and Internazionale Napoli; adopting the sky blue from Naples' shirts and the white shorts from Internazionale Napoli.

FBC Internaples
The merged club was seen by some media and fans to be a continuation of Internazionale Napoli rather than a new club; it played its games at Internazionale Napoli's Terme di Agnano rather than Naples FBC's Campo del Poligono and kept Internazionale Napoli's nickname of Gli Azzurri (The Blues) rather than I Blucelesti (The Navy Blue and Sky Blues) used by Naples. Internaples were also given the nickname I Puledri (the foals), as the horse is a symbol of Naples.

Internaples were immediately enrolled in the top-flight Prima Divisione Lega Sud championship, as both Internazionale Napoli and Naples competed in that division pre-merger. Since the end of World War I both clubs had lost dominance of the region to the likes of Puteolana and Savoia. Even with the combined strength of Internaples, Savoia still proved to be the top team in southern Italy. Internaples reached the interregional semi-final of Lega Sud in each of its first two seasons, and reached the Lega Sud final in 1925–26. This secured the club a spot in the new Divisione Nazionale for the following season.

The birth of Associazione Calcio Napoli

Under the presidency of Giorgio Ascarelli, and likely under pressure from the new fascist government to "Italianize" the club name, Internaples changed its name to Associazione Calcio Napoli on 25 August 1926. The newly renamed team also moved from the Terme di Agnano to a new stadium, the Stadio Militare dell'Arenaccia. After a poor start, with a sole point in an entire championship, Napoli was re-admitted to Serie A's forerunner, the Divisione Nazionale, by the Italian Football Federation ("FIGC"), and began to improve thanks in part to Paraguayan-born Attila Sallustro, who was the first fully fledged hero to the fans. He was a capable goal-scorer and eventually set the all-time goal-scoring record for Napoli, which was later surpassed by players like Diego Maradona and Marek Hamšík.

Napoli entered the Serie A era under the management of William Garbutt. During Garbutt's six-year stint, the club would be dramatically transformed, frequently finishing in the top half of the table. This included two third-place finishes during the 1932–33 and 1933–34 seasons, with added notables such as Antonio Vojak, Arnaldo Sentimenti and Carlo Buscaglia. However, in the years leading up to World War II, Napoli went into decline, only surviving relegation in 1939–40 by goal average.

Napoli lost a closely contested relegation battle at the end of 1942 and were relegated to Serie B. They moved from the Stadio Giorgio Ascarelli to the Stadio Arturo Collana and remained in Serie B until after the war.

 Post-war era and first trophies 
Play restarted in 1945 with two divisions: one consisting of Serie A teams from the north and one combined division of Serie A and Serie B teams from the central and south, with the top four of each division advancing to the national round that followed. Napoli won the Centro-Sud Serie A-B to secure a place in the Divisione Nazionale (where they placed fifth) and automatic promotion to the next season's Serie A. They were relegated after two seasons for a bribery scandal. The club won the Serie B title that season to ensure top flight football at the start of the 1950s. Napoli moved to their new home ground Stadio San Paolo in 1959.

Despite erratic league form with highs and lows during this period, including multiple relegations and promotions, Napoli won their first major trophy when they beat SPAL to lift the Coppa Italia in 1962, with goals from Gianni Corelli and Pierluigi Ronzon. The victory made Napoli the first team to win the Coppa while in Serie B, and they were promoted to Serie A that season. Their fourth relegation cut celebrations short the following season.

 Name change 
As the club changed their name to Società Sportiva Calcio Napoli on 25 June 1926 they began to rise up again, gaining promotion in 1964–65. Under the management of former player Bruno Pesaola, they won the Coppa delle Alpi and were back among the elite in Serie A, with consistent top-five finishes. Napoli came very close to winning the league in 1967–68, finishing just behind Milan in second place. Some of the most popular players from this period were Dino Zoff, José Altafini, Omar Sívori and hometown midfielder Antonio Juliano. Juliano would eventually break the appearance records, which still stands today.

 League stability and second Coppa Italia 

The trend of Napoli performing well in the league continued into the 1970s, with third place spots in 1970–71 and 1973–74. Under the coaching of former player Luís Vinício, this gained them entry into the early UEFA Cup competitions. In 1974–75, they reached the third round knocking out Porto 2–0 en route. During the same season, Napoli finished second in Serie A, just two points behind champions Juventus. Solid performances from locally born players such as Giuseppe Bruscolotti, Antonio Juliano and Salvatore Esposito were relied upon during this period, coupled with goals from Giuseppe Savoldi.

The club won their second Coppa Italia trophy in 1975–76, eliminating Milan and Fiorentina en route, before beating rivals Hellas Verona 4–0 in the final. That season, they also defeated Southampton 4–1 on aggregate to lift the 1976 Anglo-Italian League Cup. Napoli were entered into the UEFA Cup Winners' Cup for 1976–77, where they reached the semi-finals, losing 2–1 on aggregate to Anderlecht. In the Italian league, Napoli were still very much a consistent top six side for much of the late 1970s. Even into the earliest two seasons of the 1980s, the club were performing respectably with a third-place finish in 1980–81. Napoli's Primavera squad was also doing well at the time, winning the Torneo di Viareggio Cup in 1975 and their only Campionato Nazionale Primavera title in 1979. However, by 1983, they had slipped dramatically and were involved in relegation battles.

Napoli on the rise: Maradona era
Napoli broke the world transfer record fee after acquiring Diego Maradona in a €12 million deal from Barcelona on 30 June 1984. The squad was gradually re-built, with the likes of Ciro Ferrara, Salvatore Bagni and Fernando De Napoli filling the ranks. The rise up the tables was gradual, by 1985–86, they had a third-place finish under their belts, but better was yet to come. With the attacking trio of Maradona, Bruno Giordano, and Careca (nicknamed MaGiCa), the 1986–87 season was the landmark in Napoli's history, becoming just the third Italian team to win the double after securing the Serie A title by three points and then beating Atalanta 4–0 to lift the Coppa Italia.

Because a mainland Southern Italian team had never won the league before, this turned Maradona into a cultural, social and borderline religious icon for Neapolitans, which stretched beyond the realms of just football.

The club were unsuccessful in the European Cup in the following season and finished runners-up in Serie A. However, Napoli were entered into the UEFA Cup for 1988–89 and won their first major European title. Juventus, Bayern Munich and PAOK were defeated en route to the final, where Napoli beat VfB Stuttgart 5–4 on aggregate, with two goals from Careca and one each from Maradona, Ferrara and Alemão.

Napoli added their second Serie A title in 1989–90, defeating Milan by two points in the title race. However, this was surrounded by less auspicious circumstances as Napoli were awarded two points for a game, when in Bergamo, an Atalanta fan threw a 100 lira coin at Alemão's head.

A controversial set of events set off at the 1990 World Cup, when Maradona made comments pertaining to North–South inequality in the country and the risorgimento, asking Neapolitans to root for Argentina in the semi-finals against Italy in Naples.

The Stadio San Paolo was the only stadium during the competition where the Argentine national anthem was not jeered, Maradona bowed to the Napoli fans at the end and his country went on to reach the final. However, after the final, the Italian Football Federation (FIGC) forced Maradona to take a doping test, which he failed testing positive for cocaine; both Maradona and Napoli staff later claimed it was a revenge plot for events at the World Cup. Maradona was banned for 15 months and would never play for the club again. The club still won the Supercoppa Italiana that year, with a record 5–1 victory against Juventus, but it would be their last major trophy for 22 years. In the European Cup, they were eliminated in the second round.

Decline and resurgence
Though the club finished fourth during the 1991–92 season, Napoli gradually went into decline after that season, both financially and on the field. Players such as Gianfranco Zola, Daniel Fonseca, Ciro Ferrara and Careca had all departed by 1994. Nonetheless, Napoli qualified for the 1994–95 UEFA Cup, reaching the third round and in 1996–97, Napoli appeared at the Coppa Italia final, but lost 3–1 to Vicenza; Napoli's primavera squad won the Coppa Italia Primavera that season. Napoli's league form had dropped lower, and relegation to Serie B came at the end of 1997–98 when they won only two matches all season.

The club returned to Serie A after gaining promotion in the 1999–2000 season, though after a closely contested relegation battle, they were relegated immediately back down the following season. By August 2004, Napoli was declared bankrupt. To secure football in the city, film producer Aurelio De Laurentiis re-founded the club under the name Napoli Soccer, as they were not allowed to use their old name until the next season. FIGC placed Napoli in Serie C1, where they missed out on promotion after losing 2–1 in play-offs to local rivals Avellino in 2004–05.

Despite the fact Napoli were playing in a low division, they retained higher average attendances than most of the Serie A clubs, breaking the Serie C attendance record with 51,000 at one match. The following season, they secured promotion to Serie B and De Laurentiis brought back the club's history, restoring its name to Società Sportiva Calcio Napoli in May 2006. After just one season in Serie B, they were promoted to the top division, along with fellow "sleeping giants" Genoa. In 2010, under manager Walter Mazzarri, Napoli finished in sixth place to qualify for a 2010–11 UEFA Europa League spot. Napoli finished third in the 2010–11 season, qualifying directly for the group stage of the 2011–12 UEFA Champions League.

In the 2011–12 season, Napoli ended in fifth place in Serie A, but defeated unbeaten champions Juventus at the Stadio Olimpico to win the Coppa Italia for the fourth time in the club's history, 25 years after their last cup win. The team finished second in its group of the 2011–12 UEFA Champions League, progressing to the round of 16, where they were eliminated by eventual winners Chelsea. In 2012–13, Napoli finished in second place in Serie A, the club's best performance since winning the 1989–90 Scudetto. Edinson Cavani finished as top scorer in the division with 29 goals, which resulted in him being sold to Paris Saint-Germain for a club-record fee of €64 million.

In the 2013 close-season, Mazzarri left Napoli and Rafael Benítez became the club's manager. They finished the 2013–14 season by winning the 2014 Coppa Italia Final, their fifth title in the tournament, with a 3–1 win against Fiorentina, as well as qualifying for the Champions League, but missed out on the group stage as they lost to Athletic Bilbao in the play-off round. Their subsequent run in the Europa League ended when they lost 2–1 on aggregate to FC Dnipro in the semi-finals. They finished the 2014–15 season in fifth, with Benítez then leaving for Real Madrid and being replaced by Maurizio Sarri.

In Sarri's first season in charge in the 2015–16 season, Napoli finished in 2nd place on 82 points and were knocked out of the Europa League in the round of 32 against Villarreal. In the following season, Napoli finished in 3rd place on 86 points and were knocked out of the Champions League in the round of 16 against Real Madrid. This year saw the breakout season for Dries Mertens who scored 34 goals in all competitions after he was moved from the left-wing to centre-forward following Milik's torn Anterior cruciate ligament.

In the 2017–18 season, Napoli challenged for the title for the entire season, and finished with a club record of 91 points. However, the title ultimately went to Juventus in the penultimate round of matches. On 23 December 2017, Marek Hamšík overtook Diego Maradona as Napoli's all-time leading scorer after scoring his 115th goal. At the end of the season, Sarri left for Chelsea, succeeded by Carlo Ancelotti in May 2018. He managed the club to another second-place finish, but was sacked on 10 December 2019, following a poor run of results in the 2019–20 season which left them seventh in the table. Gennaro Gattuso was named head coach the next day. On 14 June 2020, Dries Mertens became Napoli's all-time top scorer after scoring his 122nd goal in a Coppa Italia semi-final match against Inter. Napoli went on to win the 2019–20 Coppa Italia in a penalty shoot-out against Juventus in the final.

In December 2020, Napoli renamed San Paolo after Diego Maradona, after the passing away of their beloved club icon. Napoli finished fifth in Serie A that season after a draw on the final day, missing a Champions League berth by one point.

In the 2021–22 season, Luciano Spalletti replaced Gennaro Gattuso as head coach and led the team to the third place in Serie A, securing a Champions League spot for the azzurri after a two-years absence.

Club staff

 Presidents 
Below is the official presidential history of Napoli, from when Giorgio Ascarelli took over at the club in 1926, until the present day. NameYearsGiorgio Ascarelli1926–27Gustavo Zinzaro1927–28Giovanni Maresca1928–29Giorgio Ascarelli1929–30Giovanni MarescaEugenio Coppola1930–32Vincenzo Savarese1932–36Achille Lauro1936–40Gaetano Del Pezzo1941Tommaso Leonetti1942–43Luigi Piscitelli1941–43Annibale Fienga1943–45Vincenzo Savarese1945–46 NameYearsPasquale Russo1946–48Egidio Musollino1948–51Alfonso Cuomo1951–52Achille Lauro1952–54Alfonso Cuomo1954–63Luigi Scuotto1963–64Roberto Fiore1964–67Gioacchino Lauro1967–68Antonio Corcione1968–69Corrado Ferlaino1969–71Ettore Sacchi1971–72Corrado Ferlaino1972–83Marino Brancaccio1983 NameYearsCorrado Ferlaino1983–93Ellenio F. Gallo1993–95Vincenzo Schiano di Colella(honorary president)1995–96Gian Marco Innocenti(honorary president)1997–98Federico Scalingi(honorary president)1999–2000Giorgio Corbelli2000–02Salvatore Naldi2002–04Aurelio De Laurentiis2004–

Managers
Napoli has had many managers and trainers, co-managers in some seasons, since 1926.

Current squad

 Out on loan 
.

 Primavera squad 

 Retired numbers 

In the summer of 2000, Napoli retired the jersey number 10 belonged to former club legend Diego Maradona, who played for the club from 1984 to 1991. In order, the last players to wear number 10 were Fausto Pizzi (1995–1996), Beto (in 1996–1997), Igor Protti in 1997–1998 was the last player to play and score a goal with the number 10 shirt in Serie A and Claudio Bellucci in 1998–1999 and 1999–2000 in Serie B. Karl Corneliusson wore the number 10 shirt in 2004–2005 in Serie C. In Serie C the starting players had to wear shirts with the number 1-11.

However, for regulatory reasons, the number was reissued on blue shirts 2004 to 2006 Serie C1, a tournament utilizing the old numbering from 1 to 11. The last player to wear and score goals with this shirt in an official match was Mariano Bogliacino in the home match of 18 May 2006 against Spezia, valid for the final leg of the Supercoppa di Lega Serie C1; primacy belongs to him also for last appearance in the championship, 12 May 2006 at the home match against Lanciano. As regards exclusively the championship, however, the honour goes to the Argentine footballer Roberto Sosa, the distinction of being the last to wear the 10 at the San Paolo and at the same time to score in the match against Frosinone on 30 April 2006.

Culture

Colours, badge and nicknames
As Naples is a coastal city, the colours of the club have always been derived from the blue waters of the Gulf of Naples. Originally, while using the name Naples FBC, the colours of the club implemented two shades of blue. However, since the 1920s, a singular blue tone has been used in the form of azure. Thus, Napoli share the nickname "Azzurri" with the Italy national team. The shade of blue has been sky blue in many instances.

Napoli typically wear azure shirts with white shorts at home and white shirts with either white or blue shorts away, though in recent years the away kits have often deviated from this tradition.

One of the nicknames of Napoli is "I ciucci", which means "the donkeys" in the Neapolitan language. Napoli were given this name after a particularly poor performance during the 1926–27 season. It was originally meant to be derogatory, as the Neapolitan symbol is a rampant black horse, but the club adopted the donkey as a mascot named "'''O Ciuccio".

Napoli's first badge featured a rampant horse on top of a football with the letters "ACN" around it. The current club badge features a large "N" placed within a circle. This crest can be traced back to Internazionale Napoli, which used a similar design on their shirts. Since the club officially adopted the "N badge" as its representative, Napoli have altered it slightly at various times; sometimes it features the club's name around it, sometimes it does not. The main difference between each badge is the shade of blue used. Usually the "N" is white, although it has occasionally been gold (especially prior to 1980).

"Partenopei" is a popular nickname for the club and people from the city of Naples in general. It is derived from Greek mythology where the siren Parthenope tried to enchant Odysseus from his ship to Capri. In the story, Odysseus had his men tie him to the ship's mast so he was able to resist the song of the siren. Consequently, Parthenope, unable to live with the rejection of her love, drowned herself and her body was washed up upon the shore of Naples.

Supporters and rivalries

 Support 

Napoli is the fourth most supported football club in Italy with around 13% of Italian football fans supporting the club. Like other top clubs in the country, Napoli's fanbase goes beyond the Italian border; in 2018 the society announced that the team had over 35 million supporters worldwide and 120 million people who liked to watch Napoli matches.

The main ultra groups of Napoli are Fedayn EAM 1979, Ultras Napoli, Fossato Flegreo, Secco Vive, Mastiffs, Brigata Carolina, Teste Matte, Sud1996, Nuova Guardia, Vecchi Lions and Masseria.

Napoli fans have occasionally cheered loud enough to register as earthquakes on seismographs at University of Naples Federico II.

 Rivalries 
Unlike other Italian cities such as Genoa, Milan, Rome and Turin, Napoli is the only major football club in the city and therefore there is no derby in the strict sense of the term. The now-infrequent derby with Savoia, the next largest club in Naples, was played for the first time 24 December 1939, during the knockout phase of the 1939–40 Coppa Italia, the score was 1–3 in favor of Napoli. The last meeting between the clubs was in Serie B in 2000, won 0–1 by Napoli. 

Napoli's most hated rivals are AS Roma, known as the Derby del Sole (Derby of the Sun), and the principal northern team Juventus. As Napoli is the most important southern Italian team, there are a lot of rivalries with several northern teams, like Milan, Internazionale, Atalanta and Hellas Verona They also have a rivalry with the other Roman club Lazio, and contest the Derby Mezzogiorno (Midday Derby/Derby of Southern Italy) against Bari and Derby Bourbon (referencing the family that ruled the Kingdom of the Two Sicilies) against Foggia.

The Derby del Sud Italia (Derby of Southern Italy) against Catanzaro was considered one of the most important rivalries in Italy during the 1970s.

The fans of Napoli do co-star in two particular derbies in Italy against other regional teams: Derby della Campania generally refers to a rivalry with regional clubs, mainly Avellino and Salernitana.

 Friendships 
A "friendly rivalry" with Palermo is contested, known as the Derby delle Due Sicilie (Derby of the Two Sicilies), in reference to the historical link of the former Kingdom of Two Sicilies. Another friendly rivalry exists with Catania known as the Derby del Vulcano (Volcano Derby), referencing Mount Vesuvius near Naples and Mount Etna near Catania.

Friendships with teams outside Italy exist Borussia Dortmund,  Celtic, and Lokomotiv Plovdiv, among others.

Napoli formerly had a famous and long-standing friendship with the fans of Genoa, but the friendship ended in 2019. Napoli also once had a friendship with Roma.

Finances
S.S.C. Napoli was expelled from the professional league in 2004. Thanks to Article 52 of N.O.I.F., the sports title was transferred to Napoli Soccer (later the "new" Napoli) in the same year, while the corporate entity which administered the "old" Napoli was liquidated. In the second last season before bankruptcy, the club was partially saved by the non-standard accounting practice of amortization after Silvio Berlusconi, owner of Milan and Prime Minister of Italy, introduced Italian Law 91/1981, Article 18B.

Since re-foundation in 2004, the club's large numbers of supporters provided the main source of income, particularly through gate revenues and TV rights. Napoli made an aggregate profit in 2006–07 Serie B. They have continued to be profitable since returning to Serie A. Napoli equity in 2005 was a negative €261,466, having started from €3 million capital. By 2010 the equity was at €25,107,223 and Napoli achieved self-sustainability.

Kit suppliers and shirt sponsors

Stature and statistics

League history
 1926–1929 Divisione Nazionale (1st tier)
 1929–1942 Serie A (1st tier)
 1942–1943 Serie B (2nd tier)
 1943–1946 No contests (World War II)
 1946–1948 Serie A (1st tier)
 1948–1950 Serie B (2nd tier) – Champions: 1950
 1950–1961 Serie A (1st tier)
 1961–1962 Serie B (2nd tier)
 1962–1963 Serie A (1st tier)
 1963–1965 Serie B (2nd tier)
 1965–1998 Serie A (1st tier) – Champions: 1987, 1990
 1998–2000 Serie B (2nd tier)
 2000–2001 Serie A (1st tier)
 2001–2004 Serie B (2nd tier)
 2004–2006 Serie C1 (3rd tier) – Champions: 2006
 2006–2007 Serie B (2nd tier)
 2007–present Serie A (1st tier)

Honours
 National titles 
 Serie A Winners (2): 1986–87, 1989–90 
 Coppa Italia Winners (6): 1961–62, 1975–76, 1986–87, 2011–12, 2013–14, 2019–20

 Supercoppa Italiana Winners (2): 1990, 2014

 European titles

 UEFA Cup Winners (1): 1988–89

 Other titles 
 Serie B Winners (2): 1945–46, 1949–50

 Serie C1 
 Winners (1): 2005–06 Group B

 Anglo-Italian League Cup Winners (1): 1976

 Coppa delle Alpi Winners (1):' 1966

UEFA club coefficient ranking

Records and statistics

 

Marek Hamšík holds Napoli's official appearance record, having made 520. He also holds the record for league appearances with 408 over the course of 12 years from 2007 to 2019.

The all-time leading goalscorer for Napoli is Dries Mertens, with 148 goals.

Diego Maradona finished the season of Serie A as the league's top scorer, known in Italy as the Capocannoniere'', in the 1987–88 season with 15 goals. This achievement was matched by Edinson Cavani in 2012–13, and Gonzalo Higuaín in 2015–16.

The record for most goals in the league (also including the Divisione Nazionale tournaments) belongs to Attila Sallustro, with 106 goals, while the highest scorer in Serie A is Dries Mertens with 103 goals. The record for most goals in a single league season belongs to Gonzalo Higuaín, with 36 in the 2015–16 Serie A.

The biggest ever victory recorded by Napoli was 8–1 against Pro Patria, in the 1955–56 season of Serie A. Napoli's heaviest championship defeat came during the 1927–28 season when eventual champions Torino beat them 11–0.

On 26 July 2016, Gonzalo Higuaín became the third-highest football transfer of all-time and highest ever transfer for an Italian club when he joined Juventus for €90 million.

On 31 July 2020, Napoli confirmed the signing of Victor Osimhen from Lille for a transfer fee of €70 million, making him Napoli's most expensive signing.

See also

 European Club Association
 Napoli (futsal)

References

External links

  
 S.S.C. Napoli at Serie A 
 S.S.C. Napoli at UEFA

 
Football clubs in Naples
Football clubs in Italy
Coppa Italia winning clubs
UEFA Cup winning clubs
Serie A winning clubs
Serie A clubs
Serie B clubs
Serie C clubs
Phoenix clubs (association football)
Association football clubs established in 1926
1926 establishments in Italy
2004 establishments in Italy